The basilar crest lies within the cochlear duct in the inner ear. It gives attachment to the outer edge of the basilar membrane and is a spiral ligament that projects inward below as a triangular prominence.

References

Auditory system